ʻAbd al-Karīm (ALA-LC romanization of ) is a Muslim male given name and, in modern usage, also a surname. It is built from the Arabic words ʻabd and al-Karīm, one of the names of God in the Qur'an, which give rise to the Muslim theophoric names. It means "servant of the most Generous". It is rendered as Abdolkarim in Persian, Abdulkerim in Albania, Bosnia and Abdülkerim in Turkey.

It may refer to:

Given name
Abd al-Karīm ibn Hawāzin Qushayri (986–1074), Persian philosopher
ʻAbd al-Karim al-Jili (1366–1424), Sufi author who studied in Yemen
Abdal-Karim Khan Astrakhani, Khan of Astrakhan, 1490–1504
`Abd al-Karim ibn Muhammad (ruled 1825–1834), Emir of Harar, Ethiopia
Abdülkerim Nadir Pasha (1807–1883), Ottoman Turkish soldier
Abdul-Karim Ha'eri Yazdi (1859–1937), Iranian Twelver Shia Muslim cleric
Abdul Karim (Ghanaian footballer) (born 2000), Ghanaian footballer
Abdul Karim (the Munshi) (1863–1909), Indian servant to Queen Victoria
Abdul Karim Sahitya Bisharad (1871–1953), Bangladesh author
Abdul Karim Khan (1872–1937), Indian singer
Abdul Karim Amrullah (1879–1945), Muslim reformer in Sumatra
Abd el-Krim (ca. 1882–1963), leader of the Amazigh-Riffian resistance and president of the Republic of the Rif
Abd-al Karim (1897–1927), Afghan rebel leader during the Khost rebellion (1924–1925)
Abdul Karim Disu (born 1912), Nigerian journalist
Abd al-Karim Qasim (1914–1963), Iraqi Army officer who seized power in a 1958 coup d'état
Abdelkarim Ghellab (1919–2017), Moroccan writer
Abdelkrim Ghallab (ca. 1919–2006), Moroccan writer
Abdul Karim (soil scientist) (1922–1973), Bangladeshi scientist
Abd al-Karim al-Nahlawi (1926-2016), Syrian military officer and politician
Abdul-Karim Mousavi Ardebili (born 1926), Iranian Twelver cleric
Abdul Karim (historian) (1928–2007), Bangladeshi historian and academic
Awatef Abdel Karim (born 1931), Egyptian composer
Abdelkarim Tabbal (born 1931), Moroccan poet
Abdel Karim el Kably (born 1933), Sudanese singer
Abdul Karim Abdullah al-Arashi (1934–2006), Yemeni politician
Abd al-Karim al-Iryani (born 1934), Yemeni politician
Abdul Karim Tunda (born 1943), alleged Indian bomb maker
Abdul Karim Koroma (born 1944), Sierra Leonean politician
Abdolkarim Soroush (born 1945), Iranian scientist and philosopher
Abdelkarim Badjadja (born 1945), Algerian historian
Abdul Karim Saeed Pasha (born 1945), leader of Lahore Ahmadiyya Movement
Abdul Karim al-Kabariti (born 1949), Jordanian politician
Abdul Karim, name used by Bruno Metsu (born 1954), French football manager
Abdul Karim Brahui (born 1955), Afghan politician
Abdelkrim Merry (born 1955), Moroccan footballer
Abdul Karim Luaibi (born 1959), Iraqi politician
Abdul Karim Telgi (born 1961), Indian fraudster
Abdul Karim Irgashive (born 1965), Tajik held in Guantanamo
Abdul Karim el-Mejjati (1967–2005), French-Moroccan Islamic activist killed in Saudi Arabia
Abdul Karim (canoeist) (born 1967), Indonesian canoeist
Abdelkrim El Hadrioui (born 1972), Moroccan footballer
Abdul-Karim al-Jabbar (born 1974), American footballer
Abdulkareem Elemosho (born 1977), Nigerian footballer
Abdulkareem Baba Aminu (born 1977), Nigerian writer and artist
Abdul Karim Ahmed (born 1980), Ghanaian footballer
Abdelkarim Kissi (born 1980), Moroccan footballer
Abdelkarim Nafti (born 1981), Tunisian footballer
Abdoul Karim Sylla (born 1981), Guinean footballer
Abdoul Karim Sylla (born 1992), Guinean footballer
Abdelkrim Mammeri (born 1981), Algerian footballer
Abdul Karim (Guantanamo detainee 520) (born ca. 1982), Afghan
Abdul Kareem Nabeel Suleiman Amer, or just Kareem Amer (born ca. 1984), Egyptian blogger
Abdulkareem Khadr (born 1989), Egyptian-Canadian injured in Pakistan
Abdulkarim Al-Ali (born 1991), Qatari footballer
Abdulkareem Adisa (died 2005), Nigerian soldier and politician
Abdel Karim Obeid (born 1957), Lebanese Shi'a imam
Abdelkrim Motii, Moroccan religious activist
Abdulkarim Al-Arhabi, Yemeni politician
Abdul Karim al-Anizi, Iraqi politician
Abdel-Karim Mahoud al-Mohammedawi, Iraqi politician
Abdelkarim Hussein Mohamed Al-Nasser, Saudi alleged terrorist
Abdulkareem Baba Aminu, Nigerian journalist
Abd al-Karim, the name CIA torture victim Mohamed Ahmed Ben Soud was referred to by in the Senate report on CIA torture
Abdul Karim Joumaa (born 1954), Syrian Olympic athlete
Abdul Karim (politician), Pakistani politician
Abdul Karim Farhani, Iranian Shia Cleric
Abdolkarim Hasheminejad, Iranian Shia Cleric
Abdul Karim Haghshenas, Iranian Shia Cleric

Surname
Shah Abdul Karim (1916–2009), Bangladeshi folk musician
Khalil Abdel-Karim (1928–2003), Egyptian Islamic activist
Mohamed Taki Abdoulkarim (1936–1998), President of the Comoros
Yahaya Abdulkarim (born 1944), Nigerian politician
Ali Abdul Karim (born 1953), Syrian diplomat
Rohani Abdul Karim (born 1955), Malaysian politician
Eedris Abdulkareem, Nigerian rapper
Abdul Malik Abdul Kareem, one of the perpetrators of Curtis Culwell Center attack

References

Arabic masculine given names
Iranian masculine given names
Turkish masculine given names